Bernice Pilot was an American actress. She appeared in numerous films including as the female lead in the 1929 film Hearts in Dixie. In most of Pilot's film roles, she portrayed maids.

Pilot was born in Pawnee, Oklahoma, in 1897. She died in San Bernardino, California in 1981, at age 84.

Filmography
 Hearts in Dixie (1929) as Chloe
 Penrod and Sam (1937) as Delia
 Penrod's Double Trouble (1938) as Delia
 Penrod and His Twin Brother (1938) as Delia
The Beloved Brat (1938)
 Women Are Like That (1938) as Maude
 My Bill (1938) as Beulah
 No Place to Go (1939) as Birdie
 Sweepstakes Winner (1939) as Martha (Uncredited)
 Pride of the Blue Grass (1939) as Beverly
 Criminals Within (1941) as Mamie
 Tight Shoes (1941)

References

External links

1897 births
20th-century American actresses
Actresses from Oklahoma
People from Pawnee, Oklahoma
American film actresses
Year of death missing